The Greater Washington Open was a golf tournament on the LPGA Tour from 1988 to 1989. It was played at the Bethesda Country Club in Bethesda, Maryland.

Winners
1989 Beth Daniel
1988 Ayako Okamoto

References

Former LPGA Tour events
Golf in Maryland
Women's sports in Maryland